Azam Khan Hoti (27 April 1946 – 15 April 2015) was a senior Awami National Party leader until 2013. He was the father of Ameer Haider Khan Hoti, the 25th Chief Minister of Khyber Pakhtunkhwa.

Early life
Azam Khan Hoti was born on April 27, 1946 in a respectable and renowned political family of Mardan. His father Amir Muhammad Khan was also a member of the Khudai Khidmatgar Movement founded by freedom fighter Khan Abdul Ghaffar Khan (Bacha Khan) and had spent several years behind bars due to his political activities.

He received his early education in Risalpur and later joined Aitchison College. Hoti graduated from Degree College Nowshera and joined Pakistan Army where he was commissioned in 1967. He became a captain in the Armoured Corps of the Pakistan Army. He also took part in the 1971 Indo-Pak war. However, he later resigned from the army and joined politics. n 1972, he joined the National Awami Party (NAP). When NAP was banned by Prime Minister Zulfikar Ali Bhutto, he joined the National Democratic Party (NDP) and later the Awami National Party (ANP). He subsequently went into exile and spent several years in Afghanistan.

He was a member of the ANP’s central and provincial executive committees and also led the Nangialai Pakhtun, the ANP’s youth wing for many years. Azam Hoti was twice elected as an MNA from Mardan in 1990 and 1997 on the ANP ticket from different constituencies. He was twice made the federal minister for communication in Prime Minister Nawaz Sharif’s government in 1991 and 1997. In March 1994, he was elected as a member of the Senate of Pakistan. He remained member of various Standing Committees of the Senate.

He had close family ties with Bacha Khan. His sister Begum Naseem Wali was married to late Abdul Wali Khan. ANP chief Asfandyar Wali Khan is his nephew. It may be recalled that serious differences cropped up between Azam Hoti and Asfandyar Wali when the ANP suffered a humiliating defeat in the 2013 general election. In a series of statements, he had demanded Asfandyar Wali to quit the party. Azam Hoti held Asfandyar Wali responsible for ANP’s defeat at the polls. However, he was expelled from the ANP for making allegations against party leadership. The tussle also soured his relations with his son, Ameer Haider Hoti, former chief minister of Khyber Pakhtunkhwa. He had to leave his house and hometown Mardan and was living at his Shami Road residence in Peshawar. The local elders and ANP leaders in Mardan made efforts for reconciliation between the father and son. The efforts bore fruit and the two finally reconciled. Azam Hoti went to his palatial residence in Mardan after reconciliation, but came back to Peshawar due to his illness.

In 2012, he went to London for treatment and was later treated in Peshawar and Islamabad. He also faced problems due to corruption charges dating back to his days as a federal minister and was arrested by the National Accountability Bureau (NAB). The late nationalist leader had a loving nature and was widely known as a good listener and an outspoken and articulate speaker. Due to his these attributes, he pulled huge crowds at public meeting. He was held in high esteem by ANP workers from Mardan, Swabi, Buner and Swat. Azam Hoti knew majority of his party workers by name.

References

1946 births
2015 deaths
Awami National Party politicians
Aitchison College alumni
Pakistan Army officers